The Skierstins is a medieval Stienhús built c. 1300 out of brick in Feanwâlden. It is the only remaining Stienhús in Friesland and is listed as Rijksmonument, number 11700 and is rated with a very high historical value. The building is first mentioned in 1439 on a piece of parchment.

See also
List of castles in the Netherlands

References

External links
 www.schierstins.nl

Stins in Friesland
Rijksmonuments in Friesland
Dantumadiel